Stanley Leavy (August 11, 1915 – October 31, 2016) was an American psychoanalyst. He was an alumnus of Yale University and the University of Rochester. He was a conscientious objector in World War II. He died at the age of 101 on October 31, 2016 in Newton, Massachusetts.

Publications 
The Psychoanalytic Dialogue (1987) 
In the Image of God: A Psychoanalyst's View (1997)

References

External links 
Questioning Authority
"For Fear of the Jews": Origins of Anti-Judaism in Early Christianity
The Last of Life: Psychological Reflections on Old Age and Death

1915 births
2016 deaths
American centenarians
Men centenarians
20th-century American Episcopalians